SMA Negeri 1 Wringinanom, is stands for as , is state high school that located at Sembung Village, Wringinanom, Gresik, Jawa Timur, Indonesia. SMA Negeri 1 Wringinanom also be one of Adiwiyata School(Go Green School) in Indonesia and in June 2009 President of Indonesia Mr. Susilo Bambang Yudhoyono give this award to head master of SMA Negeri 1 Wringinanom Mr. Suswanto.

History
The history of this school was started since 1996 with only 26 students and 20 teachers.
its all because sembung leader yaitu H.sumardi BA.

List of head masters
SMA Negeri 1 Wringinanom was led by 7 (last changed in 2009).

SMAN1WA events
 Miss SMAN1WA 2010

External links
  The official site of SMA Negeri 1 Wringinanom

References

Schools in Indonesia
Schools in East Java